Southfield Christian School (SCS) is a private, college-preparatory Christian school in Southfield, Michigan. It is a ministry of Highland Park Baptist Church for grades PK–12.

History

SCS was founded in 1970.

Academics
Southfield Christian has been accredited by Cognia or its predecessors since April 2004.

Athletics
The Southfield Christian Eagles are members of the Michigan Independent Athletic Conference.  The following MHSAA high school sports are offered:

Baseball (boys)
Basketball (boys & girls)
Boys state champions - 2012, 2013, 2014, 2018, 2019
Competitive Cheer (girls)
Cross country (boys & girls)
Football (boys)
Golf (boys)
Soccer (boys & girls)
Softball (girls)
Track and field (boys & girls)
Volleyball (girls)

Notable alumni
 John Coyle, speed skater 
 Tim Donnelly, California State Assemblyman
 Rob Globke, National Hockey League (NHL) player 
 Brian Rafalski, NHL player

References

External links
 Official website

Baptist schools in the United States
Christian schools in Michigan
Educational institutions established in 1970
High schools in Oakland County, Michigan
Online schools in the United States
Private elementary schools in Michigan
Private high schools in Michigan
Private middle schools in Michigan
Schools in Southfield, Michigan
Online K–12 schools